Mark Fraser Edmond (born 22 January 1977) is a New Zealand former bobsledder. He competed in the two man and the four man events at the 2002 Winter Olympics.

References

External links
 

1977 births
Living people
New Zealand male bobsledders
Olympic bobsledders of New Zealand
Bobsledders at the 2002 Winter Olympics
Sportspeople from Christchurch